Karl Ritter von Czyhlarz, or Karel Cihlář (August 17, 1833, Lovosice, Bohemia - July 21, 1914, Vienna) was a Bohemian-Austrian jurist, politician.

He taught as a professor at the Charles University in Prague (1858-1892), University of Vienna (1892-1904).

He was a specialist of the Roman law.

Karl was a member of an assembly of Bohemia (1866-1886), and a member of the Upper Chamber of the Austrian Reichsrat (1898-).

Literary works 
 Lehrbuch der Institutionen des römischen Rechts, 1933

External links
 Das weltweite Österreich Journal - für Österreicherinnen und Österreicher in aller Welt at oe-journal.at
 Representatives of Viennese Scholarship at www.univie.ac.at
 AEIOU
 http://epub.oeaw.ac.at/oebl/oebl_C/Czyhlarz_Karl_1833_1914.xml

1833 births
1914 deaths
People from Lovosice
People from the Kingdom of Bohemia
Austrian knights
Members of the House of Lords (Austria)
Austrian politicians
Austrian jurists
Members of the Bohemian Diet
German Bohemian people
Austrian people of German Bohemian descent
Charles University alumni